Goodbye December is a 2013 Malayalam-language musical romance film directed by Sajeed A and produced by Sadanandan Rangorath. The film stars debuting actress and Miss Universe India 2010, Ushoshi Sengupta and Nandini Rai.

The film also marks the debut of Shillong Chamber Choir who will be singing, composing the songs and even doing the background score for the film. The song "Madi Madi", is the first Malayalam song to be aired in BBC Radio.

Cast
 Nandini Rai
 Ushoshi Sengupta

References

2013 films
2010s Malayalam-language films
Indian romantic musical films
2010s romantic musical films